Military Miniatures is a book by Simon Goodenough published in 1977.

Contents
Military Miniatures is a book about miniatures including their history, information about collecting them, how to assemble miniatures kits, techniques for painting them, how to do conversions of miniatures, building dioramas, as well as moulding and casting miniatures.

Reception
C. Ben Ostrander reviewed Military Miniatures in The Space Gamer No. 18. Ostrander commented that "The book is highly recommended to the novice and old pro alike. If nothing else, the great photos show what can be done with a little time and effort."

Reviews
Campaigns: An International Magazine of Military Miniatures
Craft, Model, and Hobby Industry Magazine

References

1977 non-fiction books
Wargaming books